Nazlı Eda Kafkas (born November 16, 2001) is a Turkish volleyball player. She plays for Galatasaray.

Career

Vakıfbank Istanbul
Born in 2001 from Vakıfbank Istanbul infrastructure on 10 October 2020, setter Kafkas took time in the official match for the first time in front of Beylikdüzü Voleybol İhtisas.

Yeşilyurt
On 18 May 2021, she signed a 1-year loan contract with Yeşilyurt, one of the Sultans League teams.

Galatasaray
She signed a 2-year contract with Galatasaray on August 15, 2022.

References

External links
Player profile at Volleybox.net

2001 births
Living people
Turkish women's volleyball players
VakıfBank S.K. volleyballers
Yeşilyurt volleyballers
Galatasaray S.K. (women's volleyball) players